Jean-Michel André Jarre (born 24 August 1948) is a French composer, performer and record producer. He is a pioneer in the electronic, ambient and new-age genres, and is known for organising outdoor spectacles featuring his music, accompanied by vast laser displays, large projections and fireworks.

Jarre was raised in Lyon by his mother and grandparents and trained on the piano. From an early age, he was introduced to a variety of art forms, including street performers, jazz musicians and the artist Pierre Soulages. But his musical style was perhaps most heavily influenced by Pierre Schaeffer, a pioneer of musique concrète at the Groupe de Recherches Musicales.

His first mainstream success was the 1976 album Oxygène. Recorded in a makeshift studio at his home, the album sold an estimated 18 million copies. Oxygène was followed in 1978 by Équinoxe, and in 1979, Jarre performed to a record-breaking audience of more than a million people at the Place de la Concorde, a record he has since broken three times. More albums were to follow, but his 1979 concert served as a blueprint for his future performances around the world. Several of his albums have been released to coincide with large-scale outdoor events.

As of 2004, Jarre had sold an estimated 80 million albums and singles. He was the first Western musician officially invited to perform in the People's Republic of China and holds the world record for the largest-ever audience at an outdoor event for his Moscow concert on 6 September 1997, which was attended by 3.5 million people.

Biography

Early life, influences, and education
Jean-Michel Jarre was born in Lyon on 24 August 1948, to Francette Pejot, a French Resistance member and concentration camp survivor, and composer Maurice Jarre. His grandmother was Jewish. When Jarre was five, his parents separated and his father moved to the United States, leaving him with his mother. He did not see his father again until reaching the age of 18. For the first eight years of his life, Jarre spent six months each year at his maternal grandparents' flat on the Cours de Verdun, in the Perrache district of Lyon. Jarre's grandfather was an oboe player, engineer and inventor, designing an early audio mixer used at Radio Lyon. He also gave Jean-Michel his first tape recorder. From his vantage point high above the pavement, the young Jarre was able to observe street performers at work, an experience he later cited as proving influential on his art.

Jarre struggled with classical piano studies, although he later changed teachers and worked on his scales. A more general interest in musical instruments was sparked by his discovery at the Saint-Ouen flea market, where his mother sold antiques, of a Boris Vian trumpet violin. He often accompanied his mother to Le Chat Qui Pêche (The Fishing Cat), a Paris jazz club run by one of her friends from her resistance years, where saxophonists Archie Shepp and John Coltrane, and trumpet players Don Cherry and Chet Baker were regular performers. These early jazz experiences suggested to him that music may be "descriptive, without lyrics". He was also influenced by the work of French artist Pierre Soulages, whose exhibition at the Musée d'Art Moderne de la Ville de Paris he attended. Soulages' paintings used multiple textured layers, and Jarre realised that "for the first time in music, you could act as a painter with frequencies and sounds." He was also influenced by classical, modernist music; in a 2004 interview for The Guardian, he spoke of the effect that a performance of Stravinsky's The Rite of Spring had upon him:

As a young man Jarre earned money by selling his paintings, exhibiting some of his works at the Lyon Gallery – L'Œil écoute, and by playing in a band called Mystère IV. While he studied at the Lycée Michelet, his mother arranged for him to take lessons in harmony, counterpoint and fugue with Jeannine Rueff of the Conservatoire de Paris. In 1967 he played guitar in a band called The Dustbins, who appear in the film . He mixed instruments including the electric guitar and the flute with tape effects and other sounds. More experimentation was followed in 1968, when he began to use tape loops, radios and other electronic devices, in 1969 he joined the Groupe de Recherches Musicales (GRM), founded and led by Pierre Schaeffer, inventor of musique concrete. Jarre was introduced to the Moog modular synthesizer and spent time working at the studio of influential German composer Karlheinz Stockhausen in Cologne.

In the kitchen of his apartment in Rue de la Trémoille, Jarre set up a small makeshift recording studio. It included his first synthesiser, an EMS VCS 3, and an EMS Synthi AKS, each linked to Revox tape machines. For a 1969 exposition at the Maison de la Culture (Cultural House) in Reims, Jarre wrote the five-minute song "Happiness Is a Sad Song". That same year he composed and recorded "La Cage/Erosmachine", a mixture of harmony, tape effects and synthesisers, which was released in 1971.

1970s

In 1971 Jarre was commissioned by choreographer Norbert Schmucki to perform a ballet called AOR (in Hebrew, "the light"), at the Palais Garnier. He also composed background music for ballet, theatre, television programs, department stores, and advertising jingles for Pepsi-Cola, Nestlé and RTL. The music for airports, and North America libraries was composed with the VCS 3 and an Farfisa professional organ. From 1972 to 1975, Jean-Michel wrote music and lyrics for artists like Françoise Hardy, Gérard Lenorman, Christophe and Patrick Juvet. In 1972 collaborated in Olympia show, and wrote music for the International Festival of Magic. That year he also released his first solo album, Deserted Palace, and composed the soundtrack for Les Granges Brûlées (English: The Burned Barns).

Jarre's 1976 low-budget solo album Oxygène, recorded at his home studio, made him famous internationally. The music was made with analog synthesizers like the EMS VCS 3 and the EMS Synthi AKS, and recorded with a Scully 8-track recorder. Jarre initially was turned down by several record companies, until Jean-Michel decided to meet with Francis Dreyfus, the head of the Disques Motors label, to see if he could release the album, to which he accepted. The first pressing of 50,000 copies was promoted through hi-fi shops, clubs and discos, and by April 1977 had sold 70,000 copies in France. When interviewed in Billboard magazine, Motors's director Stanislas Witold said, "In a sense we're putting most of our bets on Jean-Michel Jarre. He is quite exceptional and we're sure that by 1980 he will be recognised worldwide."

Jarre's follow-up album, Équinoxe, was released in 1978, though its sales were still healthy, it had less of an impact than Oxygène, but the following year Jarre held a large open-air concert on Bastille Day, at the Place de la Concorde. The free outdoor event set a world record for the largest number of spectators ever at an open-air concert, drawing more than 1 million spectators. Although it was not the first time he had performed in concert (Jarre had already played at the Paris Opera Ballet), the 40 minute-long event, which used projections of light, images and fireworks, served as a blueprint for Jarre's future concerts. Its popularity helped create a surge in sales—a further 800,000 records were sold between 14 July and 31 August 1979—and the Frenchman Francis Rimbert featured at the event.

1980s
By the time Les Chants Magnétiques was released on 20 May 1981, Oxygène and Équinoxe had achieved global sales of about 6 million units. In its first two months the then new album sold a reported 200,000 units in France alone. The album uses sounds from the Fairlight CMI, a new instrument of which Jarre was a pioneer. Its digital technology allowed him to continue his earlier sonic experimentation in new ways.

In that same year, the British Embassy gave Radio Beijing copies of his Oxygène and Équinoxe, which became the first pieces of foreign music to be played on Chinese national radio in decades. The Republic invited Jarre to become the first western musician to play in post-Mao Zedong China. The performances were scheduled to run from 18 October to 5 November 1981. However, only 5 concerts were given in total, two in Beijing and three in Shanghai. The first, in Beijing, was initially attended mostly by officials, but before the concert began technicians realised that not enough power was available to supply the stage and auditorium. Chinese officials solved the problem by temporarily cutting power to the surrounding districts.

The stadium was almost full when the concert began, but as Beijing's buses stopped running at about 10 o'clock, about half the audience left before it finished. To boost the audience attendance for the second night, Jarre and his production team purchased some of the concert tickets and gave them to children on the streets (Jarre originally wanted the concerts to be free, but the Chinese authorities decided to charge between £0.20 and £0.50 per ticket). Recordings of the concerts, which featured one of Jarre's signature electronic instruments, the laser harp, were released as a double-disc LP in 1982.

Between February and May 1983, Jarre recorded a single LP copy of an album entitled Musique pour Supermarché (English: Music for Supermarkets) whose objective was to be the soundtrack of a show called Orrimbe, to later be auctioned with the master tapes and plates destroyed. The album was later broadcast exclusively on Radio Luxembourg with Jarre encouraging listeners to record the broadcast.

In 1984, he  released seventh studio album Zoolook, in this album was expanded the sample-based approach which had been initiated on Les Chants Magnétiques and continued on Music for Supermarkets, the album was based around multiple fragments of human voices pronouncing words and speeches in different languages from all over the world, recorded digitally by Jarre and then played back and edited on the Fairlight CMI.

In 1985, Jarre was invited by the musical director of the Houston Grand Opera to perform a concert celebrating Texas's 150th anniversary on 5 April 1986. Although he was busy with other projects and was at first unimpressed by the proposal, on a later visit to the city, he was immediately impressed by the visual grandeur of the city's skyline and agreed to perform. Also, 1985 marked the 25th anniversary of the foundation of the Lyndon B. Johnson Space Center; and NASA asked Jarre to integrate the anniversary into the concert.

Jarre worked with several Houston-based astronauts, including Bruce McCandless II and Ronald McNair, an accomplished musician who was to have played the saxophone on "Rendez-Vous VI", recorded in the weightless environment of space. The live performance was curtailed by McNair's death in the Space Shuttle Challenger disaster on 28 January 1986. Consideration was given to the cancellation of the concert; but McCandless contacted Jarre and urged him to proceed, in memory of the shuttle's crew. McNair's saxophone piece was recorded by French saxophonist Pierre Gossez and retitled "Ron's Piece". At Jarre's giant concerts in Houston and Lyon, the part was performed by McNair's friend, American saxophonist Kirk Whalum:

Rendez-vous Houston entered the Guinness Book of Records for its audience of over 1.5 million, beating his earlier record, set in 1979. The display was so impressive that a nearby freeway was blocked by passing vehicles, forcing the authorities to close it for the duration of the concert. Several months later he performed to an audience of about a million at his home city of Lyon, in celebration of a visit by Pope John Paul II. Watching from Lyon Cathedral, the Pope began the concert with a good-night blessing, a recording of which appears on Cities in Concert – Houston/Lyon.

In 1988, Jarre released his ninth studio album Revolutions, and in same year, a concert called Destination Docklands was planned for September, to be held at the Royal Victoria Dock in east London. Close to the heart of London, the location was chosen in part for its desolate environment, but also because Jarre thought the architecture was ideally suited for his music. Early in 1988 Jarre met with local officials and members of the community, but Newham Borough Council delayed their decision until 12 September the month in which the show was due to take place. The local fire service were also concerned about access in the event of a fire. Site work continued as Jarre's team searched for alternative locations in which to stage the concert, but following improvements to both on and off-site safety Jarre eventually won conditional approval on 28 September to stage two separate performances, on 8 and 9 October.

The floating stage on which Jarre and his musicians performed was built on top of four large barges. Large purpose-built display screens were built, and one of the buildings to be used as a backdrop was painted white. One large mirror ball being transported to the event fell onto the roadside, causing a degree of confusion as some people mistook it for a fallen satellite. World War II searchlights were installed, to illuminate the sky and surrounding architecture. Along with thousands in the surrounding streets and parks, 200,000 people watched Jarre and guests such as guitarist Hank Marvin perform in less than ideal conditions. Inclement weather had threatened to break the stage from its moorings, putting paid to the original plan to float the stage across the Royal Victoria Dock. Wind speeds were so high that television cameras were blown over. On the second evening the audience, which included Diana, Princess of Wales, was soaked by rain and wind.

1990s
In 1990, Jarre released En Attendant Cousteau (Waiting for Cousteau), a tribute to the French oceanographer Jacques-Yves Cousteau. On Bastille Day he performed a concert at La Défense in Paris, attended by a record-breaking audience of about two million people, again beating his earlier world record. He later promoted a concert near the Pyramids of Teotihuacan in Mexico, to be held during the solar eclipse of 11 July 1991. However, with only weeks to go, important equipment had not arrived and the sinking in the Atlantic Ocean of a cargo ship containing the purpose-built pyramidal stage and other technical and financial problems made staging the concert impossible. Jarre's disappointment was such that he "could not cope with Mexican food for two years".

About two years later he released Chronologie, an album that features Jarre's traditional collection of instruments like the ARP 2600 and Minimoog, as well as newer synthesisers such as the Roland JD-800 and the Kurzweil K2000.

Jarre was invited to the inaugural celebrations of the Palace of the Lost City, a hotel located within the Sun City in South Africa. Three concerts were held on 1, 2 and 3 December 1992, in which more than 45,000 people attended.

Chronologie was performed at a series of 16 performances across Europe called Europe in Concert. These were on a smaller scale than his previous concerts, featuring a miniature skyline, laser imaging and fireworks. Locations included Lausanne, Mont St Michel, London, Manchester, Barcelona, Seville and the Versailles Palace near Paris. A concert was also held in Hong Kong in March 1994, to mark the opening of the city's new stadium. Jarre performed many of his most well-known hits at the Concert for Tolerance on Bastille Day in 1995, celebrating the 50th anniversary of the United Nations. The Eiffel Tower was specially lit for the occasion, prompting the installation of a more permanent display. The following December, he created the website "A Space for Tolerance", which featured music from En Attendant Cousteau, played while the user browsed a variety of "visual worlds".

In 1997, Jarre returned to the analogue synthesisers of the 1970s with Oxygène 7–13, dedicated to his mentor at the GRM, Pierre Schaeffer, who had died two years before. In September that year he set his fourth record for the largest-ever outdoor-concert audience with a performance at the Moscow State University, celebrating the 850th anniversary of Moscow. The event was viewed by an audience of about 3.5 million. Another large-scale concert followed on 31 December 1999, in the Egyptian desert near Giza. The Twelve Dreams of the Sun celebrated the new millennium and offered a preview of his next album, Métamorphoses (released the following year). The show featured performances from more than 1,000 local artists and musicians, and was based on ancient Egyptian mythology about the journey of the sun and its effect upon humanity.

2000s

In 2001, he released Interior Music, an album of 1,000 copies created for use by the Danish audio-visual company Bang & Olufsen stores. The album consists of two long-form pieces: "Bonjour Hello", is a 25 minute audio collage of sounds with voices saying short sentences in French, English and Danish. The second piece, "Whispers of Life", is an instrumental version of the first, with the voices removed.

The same year he composed, with Francis Rimbert arrangements, the music for the short-lived French channel Match TV.} On 7 September 2002, Jarre held a very wet and muddy concert at the  near the city of Aalborg in Denmark, with 40,000 spectators (including 5,000 VIPs). Danish band Safri Duo featured on the track "Aero", which in fact was Bourges 2 from the performance earlier that year, and Rendez-Vous 4. The concert was broadcast live on various TV stations around the world and a shortened one-hour version was made available for rebroadcast.

By no fault of Jarre, due to 22 millimeters of rain and lack of proper preparation for and execution of the event, it took several hours for all people to be able to leave the area, and many cars were stuck until the next day. The problems subsequently became a big issue in Danish media, since, had there been an accident, it would be extremely difficult for help to get to the location. Two years previously, nine people were killed at Roskilde Festival, which had brought focus on security at large concerts. Preparations for AERO were later proven to have been lacking, and the police investigation concluded, in part, that permission for the concert should not have been granted. Reactions from spectators were mixed, some claiming it was unsafe, and others saying it was a case of overreacting.

A concert in September of that same year at a wind farm near Aalborg in Denmark proved problematic when 22 mm of rain fell on the venue, causing long delays for spectators. It also marked a change in direction in Jarre's live concerts; from Rendez-vous Houston onwards he had been accompanied by a full complement of live musicians, but at Aalborg he was accompanied only by Francis Rimbert, and having guests like the Klarup Girls Choir, Safri Duo and the Aalborg Symphonic Orchestra.

In 2003 he released Geometry of Love on Warner Music label, it was commissioned by Jean-Roch as soundtrack for his 'V.I.P. Room' nightclub in France. The physical CD was a long time out of print, but in 2018 remastered reissue was released on CD again. The album cover is a pixelated and turned counter-clockwise photo of Jarre's girlfriend at the time, Isabelle Adjani.

In October 2004 he returned to China to open its "Year of France" cultural exchange. Jarre gave two performances, the first at the Meridian Gate of the Forbidden City, and the second in Tiananmen Square. More than 15,000 spectators watched the concert at the Meridian Gate, and each concert was transmitted nationwide on live television. Jarre collaborated with musician Chen Lin. Accompanying his traditional musical repertoire, 600 projectors shone coloured light and images across various screens and objects.

In September 2004, Jarre released both a DVD and a CD in one package AERO. A compilation album made in 5.1 surround sound, it contains re-recorded versions of some of his most famous tracks, including tracks from Oxygène and Équinoxe. Accompanying the audio, the DVD features a visual image of Anne Parillaud's eyes, recorded in real time as she listened to the album. Jarre used the minimalist imagery to reinforce the audio content of the DVD.

In his role of UNESCO Goodwill Ambassador, Jarre performed a concert named Water for Life in Morocco, on 16 December 2006, to celebrate the United Nations Year of Desertification in the world. The performance was in front of the Erg Chebbi Dunes of Merzouga, in the Sahara. A free event, it was attended by about 25,000 people. Images of water and the environment were projected onto nine vertical screens, held in place by sand which was watered to keep it hard. Several permanent drinking fountains were built on the site, along with a permanent electricity installation. Jarre was accompanied by over 60 Moroccan artists. Jarre released Téo & Téa in 2007, a studio album that described the different stages of a loving relationship.

In that same year released on EMI label a new recording of his 1976 album named Oxygène: New Master Recording. Jarre performed 10 concerts (Oxygène Live) in December 2007, held in the Théâtre Marigny, located in the Champs-Élysées, Paris. Later in 2008 Jarre performed several concerts to celebrate the 30th anniversary of Oxygène, in theaters in Europe. Following one such performance at the Royal Albert Hall Jarre met Queen guitarrist Brian May, who proposed he create a concert in Tenerife for the International Year of Astronomy, but a lack of sponsorship meant that the concert did not take place. In 2009 he was selected as the artistic director of the World Sky Race, and also accepted a role as Goodwill Ambassador for the International Year of Astronomy. In 2009 he started an indoor tour in arenas throughout Europe.

2010s

On 1 March 2010, Jean-Michel Jarre started the second leg of his 2009–10 Indoors tour; on 10 June, he was presented with a Lifetime Achievement Award by Mojo magazine. On 1 July 2011, Jarre performed a large-scale concert in Monaco to celebrate the marriage of Prince Albert and his bride Charlene. A later concert was held at Carthage during the city's 12 August 2013 musical festival.

In June 2013, Jarre was elected as president of the Confédération Internationale des Sociétés d´Auteurs et Compositeurs (CISAC). In Spring 2015, Jarre released the first music from a new studio album, released in October 2015, following around four years of work. The album, Electronica 1: The Time Machine (working title: E-Project), comprises a number of collaborations with other artists. The first of these to be released was the collaboration with Gesaffelstein entitled Conquistador, followed by Glory, with M83. The track was also featured as part of the soundtrack of a short film entitled EMIC.

Other collaborations on the album include Zero Gravity tracks with; Armin van Buuren for "Stardust", John Carpenter for "A Question of Blood", Little Boots for If..! and Pete Townshend for Travelator, Pt. 2. The album became Jarre's first album in over 25 years to make the UK Top 10 at No. 8. In December 2016, the album was nominated for the Grammys 2017 Awards in the "Best Dance/Electronic Album" category. In June 2015, in collaboration with Jean-Michel Jarre, the transmedia project Soundhunters was released on the platform of the Franco-German channel ARTE. The transmedia conceptualized by the Blies brothers (Stéphane Hueber-Blies and Nicolas Blies), François Le Gall and Marion Guth of the Luxembourg production company a_BAHN, is openly inspired by the album Zoolook to which it pays tribute.

On 5 October 2016, Democracy in Europe Movement 2025 announced that Jarre would be a member of its advisory panel. The transmedia is composed of a web documentary using Zoolooks creative process involving 4 international artists (Simonne Jones, Mikael Seifu, Daedelus and Luke Vibert); a 52' documentary film directed by Beryl Koltz broadcast in September 2015 on ARTE (with the participation of Chassol, Matthew Herbert, Blixa Bargeld, Jean-Michel Jarre, Matmos, Kiz, Joseph Bertolozzi); and finally a participatory tribute music album whose tracks were chosen by Jean-Michel Jarre, entitled Zoolook Revisited. Soundhunters won the Fipa d'Or 2015 in Biarritz. Soundhunters was also presented in conference at SXSW and Convergence NYFF 2016.

In 2016, Electronica 2: The Heart of Noise was released with 15 more collaborators, including Pet Shop Boys, Hans Zimmer, Yello and Gary Numan. One track (8 "Exit") includes speech by Edward Snowden. Electronica 2 has been nominated in the Album de musiques électroniques ou dance category for the Grammy 2017 in USA & Victoires de la Musique 2017 awards in France. On 11 April 2016, it was revealed that Jarre worked in collaboration with British virtual band Gorillaz on their fifth studio album Humanz. He also composed during 2016 the soundtrack for the French news network France Info. This soundtrack was released as Radiophonie Vol. 9 on 13 January 2017.

In 2017, he performed a concert near the fortress of Masada, for the purpose of saving the Dead Sea and to highlight "the anti-environmental policies of Donald Trump." He also performed a special concert for the opening of the Año Jubilar (Jubilee year) at the Monasterio de Santo Toribio de Liébana, in Spain. Both concerts were heavily based in the Electronica Tour concept. During May 2017, Jarre toured in Canada and USA for the first time in his career, and in July 2017 another leg of the tour was held in Europe.

In March 2018, Jarre performed in South America for the first time as part of his Electronica Tour in Buenos Aires and Santiago de Chile. These concerts were originally scheduled for November 2017, but problems with the production company caused the rescheduling. The 2018 leg of the tour continued in Canada and the United States during April, including the presentation of the Electronica show with a reduced track list in the Coachella Valley Music and Arts Festival, ending with a one-off concert at Riyadh to celebrate the 88th Saudi National Day (23 September). This concert was called "The Green Concert", and involved laser projections on the skyscrapers of the financial center of Riyadh. In September 2018, a studio compilation album entitled Planet Jarre – 50 Years of Music, consisting of forty-one songs in "four quite different styles of composition", was released.

On 26 November 2018, Jarre and Scott Kirkland of The Crystal Method announced that they would be collaborating on a track on Jarre's next Electronica album. In January 2019, HSBC revealed their new musical identity, composed by Jarre. On 3 October 2019, French editor Robert Laffont published Melancolique Rodeo, Jarre's autobiography. Jarre started a promotional tour for his book. On 7 November 2019, Jarre announced the release of an application for the iOS operating system named EōN. This application contains morphing graphics created by an algorithm developed by Alexis André of Sony Computer Science Laboratories, and music generated from 7 hours of recorded material by Jarre. This music is always different on every device. The AI algorithm which composes on the fly based on the rules set by Jarre was developed by BLEASS. A limited deluxe box set was later released with excerpts from the application.

2020–present 

On 31 December 2020, Jarre held a virtual New Year's Eve concert online. He performed from a studio in Paris, but it appeared virtually from a Notre Dame setting. The show has had over 75 million viewers as of 5 January 2021. The show was done in support of his new album "Welcome to the other side," which features 12 tracks from his previously released music. The recording of the concert was released on CD, LP and Blu-ray in September 2021. VR Concert created by VRROOM received 2 Webby Award Honoree, Crystal Owl Award for the Best Live Entertainment, and Social Music Award.

On 21 June 2021, Jarre was awarded Commander to the Legion of Honour by French president Emmanuel Macron at the Elysée presidential palace in Paris. After the ceremony he performed at the same venue as part of the Fête de la Musique. In March 2022 Jarre presented a live project, Oxymore, at Radio France's Hyper Weekend Festival located at Paris. His twenty-second studio album Oxymore was released on 21 October 2022 by Sony Music and Menart Records as a tribute to Pierre Henry. Some songs were accompanied by a remix created by different artists such as Brian Eno, Nina Kraviz, Armin van Buuren, the first single from the album "Brutalism" was released along with a remix made by Depeche Mode member Martin Gore. OXYMORE was created as multiformat concert in VR by VRROOM Team and received Webby Awards Nomination and Honoree, Crystal Owl Award for Best Production Design, Raindance Immersive Honourable Jury Mentioning. In July 2022, his music publishing catalog was acquired by BMG Rights Management.

Personal life
Jarre was married to Flore Guillard from 1975 until 1977. He met his second wife, actress Charlotte Rampling, at a dinner party in St Tropez in 1976. The two married, and Jarre gained custody of his daughter Émilie Charlotte, and Rampling did the same with her son Barnaby, also Jarre and Rampling had David as a son. Jarre and Rampling separated in 1996 and divorced in 2002. He had a brief relationship with Isabelle Adjani, and married French actress Anne Parillaud in May 2005. In November 2010 the couple announced their divorce. 

Jarre started dating Chinese actress Gong Li in 2016. They got married in 2019, but have kept the relationship very private.

Jarre has a half-sister, Stéphanie Jarre, from one of Maurice Jarre's other marriages. His stepbrother, Kevin Jarre, died in 2011. Although Maurice and Jean-Michel remained estranged, following Maurice's death in 2009, Jarre paid tribute to his legacy.

Jarre said about his father: "My father and I never really achieved a real relationship. We probably saw each other 20 or 25 times in our lifetime. When you are able, at my age, to count the times you have seen your father, it says something... I think it's better to have conflict, or, if you have a parent who dies, you grieve, but the feeling of absence is very difficult to fill, and it took me a while to absorb that.

Large concerts

Honours

 1976 – Grand Prix du Disque by L'Académie Charles Cros, for Oxygène
 1976 – "Personality of The Year" by People magazine (U.S.)
 1978 – Midem award
 1979 – Guinness Book of Records entry for the biggest concert ever (La Concorde)
 1981 – Honorary member of the Beijing Conservatory of Music.
 1984 – Grand Prix du Disque by L'Académie Charles Cros, for Zoolook.
 1985 – Instrumental album of the year, at the Victoires de la Musique in France, for Zoolook
 1986 – Instrumental album of the year, at the Victoires de la Musique, for Rendez-vous
 1986 – Musical spectacle of the year, at the Victoires de la Musique, for the Rendez-Vous Houston concert
 1987 – New Guinness Book of Records entry for the biggest concert ever (Rendez-Vous Houston)
 1987 – "European musician Person of the Year" by People magazine
 1990 – An asteroid, 4422 Jarre, is named in his honour.
 1990 – New Guinness Book of Records entry for the biggest concert ever (Paris La Défense: A City in Concert)
 1993 – UNESCO Goodwill Ambassador
 1994 – Victoire de la Musique for Chronologie.
 1994 – Victoire de la Musique for Europe in Concert.
 1995 – Awarded Chevalier de la Légion d'Honneur from the French Government.
 1997 – New Guinness Book of Records entry for the biggest concert ever with 3.5 million watching at Moscow's 850th anniversary
 1998 – IFPI's Platinum Europe Award
 2005 – HCA Ambassador for the Hans Christian Andersen 2005 Bicentenary Festival
 2006 – Polish Television Academy's "Super Wiktor" award for "Space of Freedom"
 2006 – Gdańsk's Man of the Year 2005 Award
 2007 – Eska Music Awards Special Award
 2008 – Doctor Honoris Causa by the Mendeleev Russian University of Chemistry and Technology
 2010 – MOJO Lifetime Achievement Award.
 2010 – Grand Prix des Musiques Electroniques SACEM
 2010 – Honorary citizen of Gdansk.
 2011 – International Cavalchina Award.
 2011 – Awarded Officier de la Légion d'Honneur from the French Government.
 2012 – Awarded the "Miembro Honorífico del Claustro Universitario de las Artes" (Honorary Fellow of the University Senate of the Arts) by the University of Alcalá and the Society of Artists of Spain (AIE).
 2013 – Awarded the Steiger Award in Germany.
 2013 – Elpida Award.
 2014 – Q Innovation of Sound award.
 2014 – INA Distinction Numérique Award.
 2015 – GQ Man of the Year.
 2017 – Roland Lifetime Achievement Award.
 2017 – SPA medal of honor.
 2017 – Stephen Hawking Medal for Science Communication by the Starmus Festival and Stephen Hawking.
 2018 – Honorary president of INA GRM.
 2018 – Honorary member of Polish Authors Society Zaiks.
 2019 - Hungarian Music Award for Best Foreign Electronic Recording (Equinoxe Infinity) (nominated)
 2021 – Commander of the Legion of Honour by President Macron

Discography 

 1972 – Deserted Palace
 1973 – Les Granges Brûlées
 1976 – Oxygène
 1978 – Équinoxe
 1981 – Les Chants Magnétiques
 1982 – Les Concerts en Chine
 1983 – Musique pour Supermarché
 1984 – Zoolook
 1986 – Rendez-Vous
 1988 – Revolutions
 1990 – En attendant Cousteau
 1993 – Chronologie
 1997 – Oxygène 7–13
 2000 – Métamorphoses
 2001 – Interior Music
 2002 – Sessions 2000
 2003 – Geometry of Love
 2007 – Téo & Téa
 2007 – Oxygène: New Master Recording
 2015 – Electronica 1: The Time Machine
 2016 – Electronica 2: The Heart of Noise
 2016 – Oxygène 3
 2017 – Radiophonie Vol. 9
 2018 – Equinoxe Infinity
 2019 – Snapshots from EōN
 2020 – Radiophonie Vol. 10
 2021 – Amazônia
 2022 – Oxymore

See also
 List of ambient music artists
 List of Jean-Michel Jarre compositions with multiple titles
 List of Jean-Michel Jarre concerts

Explanatory notes

References

Citations

Sources

External links

 
 

1948 births
Living people
Ableton Live users
Commandeurs of the Légion d'honneur
Epic Records artists
French electronic musicians
French experimental musicians
French keyboardists
French male composers
Musicians from Lyon
New-age synthesizer players
Polydor Records artists
Progressive rock keyboardists
Pupils of Karlheinz Stockhausen
Sony Music Spain artists
UNESCO Goodwill Ambassadors